Vandish (also Romanized as Vandīsh) is a village in Baharestan Rural District, in the Central District of Nain County, Isfahan Province, Iran. At the 2006 census, its population was 121, in 41 families.

References 

Populated places in Nain County